Asartodes is a genus of snout moths. It was described by Émile Louis Ragonot in 1893 and is known from France and Spain.

Species
 Asartodes monspesulalis 
 Asartodes zapateri

References

Phycitini
Pyralidae genera
Taxa named by Émile Louis Ragonot